BINP may refer to:

 Budker Institute of Nuclear Physics in Russia
 Bwindi Impenetrable National Park in Uganda